Pocket Gangsters (Hindi: पॉकेट गैंगस्टर्स) is a 2015 Indian Hindi language comedy drama film written and directed by Hemant Nilim Das, produced by V. M. Shah, and starring Madhur Mittal, Raghubir Yadav, and Mukesh Bhatt.  Though initially announced to release in July 2013 and then re-slated for September 2014, the film was finally released January 2015.

Synopsis
Pocket Gangsters is the story of the world of crime where some criminals have set their goals on kidnapping and making hostage demand ransoms from the relatives or friends of those taken. What begins as drama becomes a comic thriller when they turn their criminal attention toward the daughter of a wealthy man in order to gain millions.

Cast
 Madhur Mittal as Vicky Ranawat
 Raghubir Yadav as Papa
 Mukesh Bhatt as Billoo Download
 Shivangi Mehra as Mira
 Vijay Raaz as Madhubali
 Malabyaborthakur & Prashantt as Malabyabor Thakur

Production

Inspiration

Kidnapping has become an illicit world-wide business netting 150 billion dollars per year. This film addresses the issue in a darkly comedic fashion.  Pocket Gangsters addresses the dark world of "pocketing" human lives, IE: putting a victim's life in grave peril and demanding an obscene amount of ransom from the relatives or friends of the hostage. In the film, a young woman whose family is worth millions, is kidnapped.  Director Hemant Nilim Das related that the film "is loosely based on the story of the kidnapping and murder of an NGO-activist Sanjay Ghose" as "a hostage drama cum comic thriller," and inspired by events centered in Guwahati, an area which has become "the epicenter of child-kidnapping".

Filming
In May 2013, the film was reported to have entered production. Playback singer Shalmali Kholgade, known for her multiple awards for Ishaqzaade's "Pareshaan" sang for the "Janiyaa jaaniyaa" track for this film. Actor Raghubir Yadav held the role of a blind gangster and memorized the entire 127 page Pocket Gangsters script in 4 hours in preparation for his role, as well as having spent time studying students at a school for the blind to educate himself for portraying a blind character. An issue that affected the project was actor Vijay Raz being injured while shooting a combat scene with Madhur Mittal. Being a one-take film, he continued. After completing the scene, he was taken to a clinic and treated for a "minor injury with swellings".  The project also dealt with freezing weather. One morning when shooting a swimming pool sequence at Guwahati, the temperature was as low as -4 °C.

Controversy
An incident creating controversy was the leaked releasing of a raw and unedited kidnapping and rape scene from the film.  This angered the director and resulted in his sending a legal notice to news and content website IndyanNewz.com for their unauthorized leaking of the film's proprietary property.  That leak resulted in a controversy questioning the rape scene being used for the film's promotion.

Release
The film was initially announced with a slated release date in July 2013, and subsequently re-slated for a release for September 2014, but due to delays in post-production, release was postponed until finally being released in January 2015.  Being noted as "India's first one-take, one-shot and uncut film", the finished film released January 2015  in over 900 theater screens across India.

Awards 
 Best director of the feature film by Los Angeles World International Film Festival: Hemant Nilim Das
 Best audience choice award by Bioscope Global Film Festival: Vikam m. Shah
 Best lead actor (male) nominee by Bare Bones Film & Music Festival: Madhur Mittal 
 Best lead actor (female) nominee by Bare Bones Film & Music Festival: Shivangi Mehra
 Semi finalist of Los Angeles CineFest: Pocket Gangsters
 Best foreign language feature by Bare Bones Film & Music Festival: Pocket Gangsters
 Bone head of excellence award by Bare Bones Film & Music Festival:Hemant Nilim Das
 Bone head of excellence award by Bare Bones Film & Music Festival:Vikram M. Shah
 Selection for feature film of 2017 by Under Ground Room: Pocket Gangsters
 Official selection in Independent Film Collaborative 2017: Pocket Gangsters
 Winner of 2nd Cinema London Film Festival 2017: Pocket Gangsters
 Malta international film festival award: Pocket Gangsters
 Winner of Intl. Film Festival for Women, Social Issues & Zero Discrimination 2017: Pocket Gangsters
 Gold Award for best feature film by International Film Festival: Pocket Gangsters
 Selected in Cameroon Intl. Film Festival 2017: Pocket Gangsters
 Selected in AMAZON Underground Film Festival 2017: Pocket Gangsters
 Pre-selected in ROME Film Awards 2017: Pocket Gangsters
 Selection in Direct Monthly Online Film Festival 2016: Pocket Gangsters
 Winner of Los Angeles World Intl. Film Festival 2016 Pocket Gangsters
 Selection in Eurocinema Film Festival 2016: Pocket Gangsters
 Best director by Los Angeles World International Film Festival: Hemant Nilim Das
 Selection in Kashmir Intl. Film Festival 2018: Pocket Gangsters
 Selection for the feature film of 2017 by Under Ground Room: Pocket Gangsters
 Selection in HK world Intl. Film Festival 2016: Pocket Gangsters
 Winner of Bioscope Global Film Festival 2016: Pocket Gangsters
 Winner of 2nd Cinema London Film Festival 2017: Pocket Gangsters

Soundtrack

Reception
Times of India praised the project, writing "The plot has numerous twists and turns, the storytelling is highly cathartic and music is romantic. Truly a gangster spirited feature... the film engages you from the beginning till end with shock and awe."

References

External links
 Pocket Gangsters at the Internet Movie Database
  as archived April 17, 2015
 Official Facebook

2015 films
2010s Hindi-language films
2015 directorial debut films